William Duffy Keller (born October 29, 1934) is a senior United States district judge of the United States District Court for the Central District of California.

Education and career

Born in Los Angeles, California, Keller received a Bachelor of Science degree from the University of California, Berkeley in 1956 and a Bachelor of Laws from the UCLA School of Law in 1960. He was an Assistant United States Attorney of the Southern District of California from 1961 to 1964. He was in private practice in California from 1964 to 1972. He was the United States Attorney for the Central District of California from 1972 to 1977. He was in private practice in California from 1977 to 1984.

Federal judicial service

Keller was nominated by President Ronald Reagan on September 11, 1984, to the United States District Court for the Central District of California, to a new seat created by 98 Stat. 333. He was confirmed by the United States Senate on October 3, 1984, and received his commission on October 4, 1984. He assumed senior status on October 29, 1999.

References

Sources
 

1934 births
Living people
Judges of the United States District Court for the Central District of California
United States district court judges appointed by Ronald Reagan
20th-century American judges
University of California, Berkeley alumni
UCLA School of Law alumni
Lawyers from Los Angeles
Assistant United States Attorneys
21st-century American judges